Forest Park is the second most populous city in Hamilton County, Ohio, United States. It is a suburb of Cincinnati. The population was 20,189 at the 2020 census.

Geography
Forest Park is located at  (39.286408, -84.520363).

Borders
Forest Park borders the following:

History
The City of Forest Park, Ohio was founded in 1956, two years after private developers Marvin Warner and Joseph Kanter purchased 3,400 acres of 5,930 acres north of Cincinnati originally set aside in 1935 by the Resettlement Administration under President Franklin D. Roosevelt to relocate struggling urban and rural families to one of three such communities planned by the government called Greenbelt towns.

The Greenbelt concept was abandoned in 1949 and the as yet undeveloped acreage of Greenhills, Ohio, which had opened in 1938, became available for purchase by the Warner-Kanter Corporation in 1954. After two years of planning they opened homes for purchase in the first residential area of Forest Park, the C section, in March 1956.

After growing to a population of 4800 in 1960 and incorporation as a village in 1961, then achieving city status in 1968, Forest Park intentionally became an “open city,” regularly adopting and passing resolutions and ordinances welcoming citizens regardless of race, creed or national origin, a policy intended to maintain the city's commitment to diversity.

Toward this end, in 1978, the Forest Park Housing Commission created “A Comprehensive Strategy for Maintaining Diversity in Forest Park, “to combat discriminatory practices by realtors, builders and corporations.”

After a 1980 lawsuit filed by the city against a builder was dismissed for insufficient evidence, the Forest Park council issued a statement declaring that “people have the right to choose where to live, work or play based on their own free choice.  That right must be secured for all people and never be artificially restricted.”

The Quality of Integrated Life resolution of 1982 would serve as a guide to integrated living, reinforcing the long-held view that diversity was a strength of Forest Park as the city moved toward a new century. In 1991 this view was reinforced when a Quality of Life Task Force issued a vision statement reflecting the “shared values of a multicultural citizenry.”

In the minds of its residents and outsiders, Forest Park's commitment to diversity in an open community became a model for 21st century living.

Demographics

2010 census
As of the census of 2010, there were 18,720 people, 7,212 households, and 4,924 families living in the city. The racial makeup of the city was 24.9% White, 65.0% African American, 0.2% Native American, 2.2% Asian, 0.2% Pacific Islander, 3.9% from other races, and 3.6% from two or more races. Hispanic or Latino of any race were 6.4% of the population.

There were 7,212 households, of which 35.8% had children under the age of 18 living with them, 40.8% were married couples living together, 21.9% had a female householder with no husband present, 5.5% had a male householder with no wife present, and 31.7% were non-families. 26.6% of all households were made up of individuals, and 7.3% had someone living alone who was 65 years of age or older. The average household size was 2.59 and the average family size was 3.13.

The median age in the city was 35.8 years. 26.9% of residents were under the age of 18; 9.1% were between the ages of 18 and 24; 26.2% were from 25 to 44; 26% were from 45 to 64; and 11.7% were 65 years of age or older. The gender makeup of the city was 46.4% male and 53.6% female.

2000 census
As of the census of 2000, there were 19,463 people, 7,505 households, and 5,238 families living in the city. The population density was 2,990.4 people per square mile (1,154.3/km2). There were 7,748 housing units at an average density of 1,190.4 per square mile (459.5/km2). The racial makeup of the city was 36.70% White, 56.26% African American, 0.11% Native American, 3.67% Asian, 0.08% Pacific Islander, 0.99% from other races, and 2.20% from two or more races. Hispanic or Latino of any race were 1.48% of the population.

There were 7,505 households, out of which 34.0% had children under the age of 18 living with them, 50.4% were married couples living together, 15.6% had a female householder with no husband present, and 30.2% were non-families. 24.9% of all households were made up of individuals, and 5.3% had someone living alone who was 65 years of age or older. The average household size was 2.58 and the average family size was 3.12.

In the city the population was spread out, with 27.1% under the age of 18, 8.4% from 18 to 24, 31.9% from 25 to 44, 23.6% from 45 to 64, and 9.1% who were 65 years of age or older. The median age was 34 years. For every 100 females, there were 92.3 males. For every 100 females age 18 and over, there were 88.0 males.

The median income for a household in the city was $49,298, and the median income for a family was $55,618. Males had a median income of $38,682 versus $28,454 for females. The per capita income for the city was $21,820. About 5.1% of families and 6.0% of the population were below the poverty line, including 8.2% of those under age 18 and 7.3% of those age 65 or over.

Education
The Winton Woods City School District covers most of Forest Park, along with Greenhills and Springfield Township.

Forest Park is served by a branch of the Public Library of Cincinnati and Hamilton County.

References

External links
 City website
 Winton Woods City School District
 Waycross Community Media for Forest Park area

Cities in Hamilton County, Ohio
Cities in Ohio
1956 establishments in Ohio